Arthur Albert Attwood (1 December 1901 – 6 December 1974) was a footballer who played as a forward in the Football League for Walsall, Everton, Bristol Rovers and Brighton & Hove Albion.

References

1901 births
1974 deaths
Sportspeople from Walsall
English footballers
Association football forwards
Walsall LMS F.C. players
Walsall F.C. players
Everton F.C. players
Bristol Rovers F.C. players
Brighton & Hove Albion F.C. players
Northfleet United F.C. players
Hove United F.C. players
English Football League players